The 2020 SEC Championship Game presented by Dr. Pepper was a college football game played on Saturday, December 19, 2020, at Mercedes-Benz Stadium in Atlanta, Georgia. The game determined the 2020 champion of the Southeastern Conference (SEC). The game, the 29th SEC Championship, featured the Florida Gators, champions of the East division, and the Alabama Crimson Tide, champions of the West division.

Teams

Florida 

Florida entered the championship game with a record of 8–2, all in conference play. Their losses came against Texas A&M and LSU, each by three points. Florida compiled a record of 7–5 in prior SEC Championship Games, having last appeared in 2016 and having last won in 2008.

Alabama 

Alabama entered the championship game with a record of 10–0, all in conference play. The scored at least 38 points in each of their regular season games, and won each contest by at least 15 points. Alabama compiled a record of 8–4 in prior SEC Championship Games; after last losing in 2008, they won each of their next six appearances (2009, 2012, 2014, 2015, 2016, and 2018).

Game summary

Statistics

See also
 Alabama–Florida football rivalry

References

External links
 Game statistics at statbroadcast.com

Championship Game
SEC Championship Game
SEC Championship Game
2020 in sports in Georgia (U.S. state)
2020 in Atlanta
Alabama Crimson Tide football games
Florida Gators football games